= Benci Jadi Bucin =

Indonesian teen television series

- Genre: Teen; Musical drama
- Screenplay by: Birama; Yogi Yose
- Story by: Birama; Yogi Yose
- Directed by: Yogi Yose
- Starring: Jameelah Saleem; Adzando Davema; Rafi Sanjaya; Bulan Sofya; Axelo Nababan; Zara Leola; Yusuf Kartiko; Ayya Renita; Ayu Permatasari; Fatmasury Dahlan; Hami Diah; Kris Anjar; Ada Bombom; Elgi Purnama; Roby Tremonti
- Opening theme: "Memori Kita" by Nyoman Paul
- Ending theme: "Memori Kita" by Nyoman Paul
- Composer: Joseph S. Djafar
- Country of origin: Indonesia
- Original language: Indonesian
- No. of seasons: 1
- No. of episodes: 22

Production
- Executive producers: Filriady Kusmara; M. Kamil Wahyudi; Edward Chandra
- Producer: Yudha Santoro
- Cinematography: Omar Housny
- Camera setup: Multi-camera
- Running time: 60 minutes
- Production company: MNC Pictures

Original release
- Network: RCTI
- Release: 1 September – 24 September 2025

Benci Jadi Bucin is an Indonesian teen television series produced by MNC Pictures that aired from 1 September 2025 to 24 September 2025 on RCTI. The show stars Adzando Davema, and Jameelah Saleem.

== Plot ==
Dinda, a girl who has lived in the Seribu Kasih orphanage since childhood, holds fast to the belief that dreams can change lives. Despite her limited past, Dinda is determined to achieve a brighter future. When she entered the 11th grade, she boldly applied to Merdeka Impian High School (MERI) through a scholarship, an elite school that is the dream of many students.

However, Dinda's journey at her new school was not smooth. On the day of the scholarship entrance exam, Dinda accidentally stepped on a limited edition pair of shoes belonging to Daffa, a popular student known for being rich, arrogant, and having a strong gang. Their small argument became a topic of conversation and went viral on the school's social media platform. This led to Dinda being labeled "the orphanage kid who dared to cause trouble at a sultan's school."

Behind his cold demeanor, Daffa harbored deep wounds. He lived in the shadow of his mother, Indah, an ambitious woman who demanded Daffa inherit the family business. Indah never gave Daffa the space to determine his own path in life.

== Cast ==
- Jameelah Saleem as Dinda Cemelia
- Adzando Davema as Daffa Merdeka
- Rafi Sanjaya as Arya Darmawan
- Bulan Sofya as Sydney Nastiti
- Axelo Nababan as Paul
- Moza Mutiara as Chelsea Sabrina
- Zara Leola as Tara Lestari
- Yusuf Kartiko as Timo
- Ayya Renita as Hana
- Ayu Permatasari as Indah Cahaya
- Fatmasury Dahlan as Ratu Tesa
- Hami Diah as Mbak Surti
- Kris Anjar as Joko
- Ada Bombom as Udin
- Elgi Purnama as Acho
- Eloy Maharani as Miss Helen
- Ardy Mudawal as kepala sekolah
- Justyn Valentino as Roni
- Baby Rau as Vita
- Aurel Asha as Sylvi
- Roby Tremonti as Marcel

== Production ==
=== Casting ===
Adzando play the lead roles, Daffa Merdeka, marking him television debut. Axelo Nababan confirmed to play Paul, also marking him television debut.
